Ugly Boy may refer to:

 The Ugly Boy, a 1918 Hungarian film 
 "Ugly Boy", a song from the 2014 album Donker Mag by Die Antwoord